Den Run is a stream located entirely within Ritchie County, West Virginia.

Den Run was descriptively named by the Indians.

See also
List of rivers of West Virginia

References

Rivers of Ritchie County, West Virginia
Rivers of West Virginia